Kuik-e Hasan (also Romanized as Kū’īk-e Ḩasan; also known as Kūyakī Ḩesām, Kūyakī-ye Ḩasan, and Kūyekī-ye Ḩasam) is a village in Dasht-e Zahab Rural District, in the Central District of Sarpol-e Zahab County, Kermanshah Province, Iran. At the 2006 census, its population was 612, in 123 families.

References 

Populated places in Sarpol-e Zahab County